Mousa Namjoo (17 December 1938 – 29 September 1981) was an Iranian military who served as the minister of defence and armed forces logistics in August to September 1981.

Biography
Namjoo was born in Bandar-e Anzali on 17 December 1938. He graduated from Officers' School (now Imam Ali Military University). He was married and had three children.

He worked at the National Military Academy with the rank of colonel. He was instrumental in developing a cooperation between the Iranian Revolutionary Guards Corps and army before and during the Iran Iraq war. He also fought in the war. He was appointed minister of defence and armed forces logistics to the interim government led by Prime Minister Mohammad-Reza Mahdavi Kani on 2 September 1981.

Death

Namjoo was killed in a plane crash together with 80 other people on 29 September 1981 near Tehran. The aircraft was a US-made C-130 Hercules transport plane. Other leading military figures killed in the crash were Valiollah Fallahi, Javad Fakoori and Yousef Kolahdouz. They were returning to Tehran from southwestern battlefront with Iraq. On 1 October 1981, a funeral service was held for Namjoo and other victims at the military academy in Tehran.

Ayatollah Ruhollah Khomeini made a speech following the incident indicating the Mujahedeen Khalq as the perpetrator without clearly condemning the leftist group.

Legacy
Namjoo's biography entitled A Man with Orange Color was published by Ezzatollah Alvandi in 2005.

References

External links

20th-century Iranian politicians
1938 births
1981 deaths
Defence ministers of Iran
Islamic Republic of Iran Army colonels
Islamic Republic of Iran Army personnel of the Iran–Iraq War
People from Bandar-e Anzali
Victims of aviation accidents or incidents in Iran